Al Clark may refer to:

Al Clark (American football) (born 1948), American football player
Al Clark (Blackwater), co-founder of Blackwater in 1997
Al Clark (film editor) (1902–1971), nominated for the Academy Award for Best Film Editing five times
Al Clark (producer), Australian film producer and actor
Al Clark (umpire) (born 1948), former baseball umpire

See also
Albert Clark (disambiguation)
Alan Clark (disambiguation)